The 2019 season was the Cleveland Browns' 67th in the National Football League (NFL), their 71st overall, their second full season under general manager John Dorsey and their only season under head coach Freddie Kitchens. They finished 6–10 despite entering the season with high expectations, failing to improve on their 7–8–1 record from 2018 or end their franchise-record and league-high 16-year playoff drought. They also suffered a 12th consecutive losing season, also a franchise record and the longest such streak in the league. Following the season, the Browns fired Kitchens after one season and Dorsey left his position as well.

Offseason

Coaching changes
On October 29, 2018, after Week 8 of the 2018 season, the Browns fired head coach Hue Jackson. Jackson posted a record of  record during his 2-season tenure with the Browns. Jackson failed to win any away games during his tenure and lost every game in 2017. Offensive coordinator Todd Haley was also fired the same day. Defensive coordinator Gregg Williams finished out the 2018 season with a  record as interim head coach.

On January 12, 2019, the Browns promoted interim offensive coordinator Freddie Kitchens to head coach.

On January 12, the Browns hired former Minnesota Vikings special teams coordinator Mike Priefer to the same role.

On January 14, the Browns hired former Tampa Bay Buccaneers offensive coordinator Todd Monken as offensive coordinator and former Arizona Cardinals head coach Steve Wilks as defensive coordinator.

Roster changes

Re-signings

Players added

Players lost

Trade notes

Players added and lost
During the 2019 off-season, the Browns also signed DT Brandin Bryant, WR Jaelen Strong, and G Bryan Witzmann, but released them prior to the start of the season

2019 NFL draft

Undrafted free agents

Uniform changes 
On September 4, the Browns announced that they would use their brown "color rush" uniforms, which they debuted in 2018, as their primary home uniforms for 2019, wearing them for six home games. These uniforms feature dark brown jerseys with orange numbers and orange stripes, and dark brown pants with the same orange stripes.

Staff

Final roster

Preseason

Regular season

Schedule

Note: Intra-division opponents are in bold text.

Game summaries

Week 1: vs. Tennessee Titans

The Browns opened the season with a home game against the Tennessee Titans with high hopes after their 7–8–1 season in 2018. The Browns scored a touchdown on their first drive to take a 6–0 lead, but the Titans controlled the game after that, taking a 12–6 lead into halftime. After a Titans field goal, a Browns' touchdown late in the third quarter made the score 15–13, but that is the closest they would get as quarterback Baker Mayfield threw three interceptions and the Titans scored four unanswered touchdowns to secure a 43–13 win.

With the loss, the Browns opened the season at 0–1. The Browns failed to win in Week 1 for the 15th consecutive season. They also committed 18 penalties for 182 yards, their most penalties in a game since 1951.

Week 2: at New York Jets

The Browns traveled to New York for a Monday Night Football matchup against the Jets, marking the Browns' first MNF appearance since 2015. The Browns opened the scoring with a pair of Austin Seibert field goals—the first of his career—in the first quarter to take a 6–0 lead. After the Browns added a Nick Chubb touchdown run, the teams traded field goals late in the second quarter to give the Browns a 16–3 halftime lead. The only score of the second half was an 89-yard touchdown pass from Baker Mayfield to Odell Beckham Jr. to give the Browns a 23–3 win. The Browns' defense had a solid performance with four sacks (including three by Myles Garrett), one takeaway and two fourth-down stops.

With the win, the Browns improved to 1–1. Punter Jamie Gillan was named the AFC Special Teams Player of the Week; he made six punts, five of which landed inside the Jets' 20-yard line, averaging 38.5 yards per kick.

Week 3: vs. Los Angeles Rams

The Browns hosted the Los Angeles Rams in their first Sunday Night Football appearance since 2008. The Browns held a 6–3 halftime lead after a highly defensive first half. The only scoring came via field goals from the Browns' Austin Seibert and the Rams' Greg Zuerlein. In the third quarter, the Rams drove down the field and scored a touchdown on a Jared Goff pass to Cooper Kupp to take a 10–6 lead. The Browns responded on their next drive with a Baker Mayfield pass to Demetrius Harris to retake the lead at 13–10. Early in the fourth quarter, the Rams regained the lead, 17–13, on another Goff touchdown pass to Kupp and extended their lead to 20–13 with a Zuerlein field goal. Late in the game, the Browns had a chance to tie the score with a touchdown. In the final minute, the Browns had the ball first and goal from the Rams' 4-yard line, but Mayfield threw three incomplete passes, followed by an interception on fourth down.

With the loss, the Browns fell to 1–2.

Week 4: at Baltimore Ravens

The Browns opened the scoring in the first quarter with a Baker Mayfield touchdown pass to Ricky Seals-Jones. However, the Ravens responded with a Lamar Jackson touchdown pass to Miles Boykin to tie the game at 7–7. An Austin Seibert field goal gave the Browns a 10–7 lead at halftime. In the second half, Nick Chubb led the Browns, scoring a career-high three touchdowns and rushing for 128 of his 165 yards on the day, including an 88-yard touchdown run to extend the Browns' lead just two plays after the Ravens had cut the score to 24–18. A Dontrell Hilliard touchdown run extended the Browns' lead to 40–18. The Ravens added a garbage-time touchdown to make the final score 40–25.

With the win, the Browns improved to 2–2 and moved into first place in the AFC North for the first time since Week 10 of 2014. For his 165 yards and three touchdowns, Chubb was named the AFC Offensive Player of the Week and FedEx Ground Player of the Week

On October 3, punter Jamie Gillan was named the AFC Special Teams Player of the Month for September. Gillan had 11 punts inside the 20-yard line and helped the Browns limit opponents to just 19 punt return yards for the month.

Week 5: at San Francisco 49ers

The 49ers opened the scoring with a pair of Matt Breida touchdowns in the first quarter – an 83-yard run and a 5-yard reception from Jimmy Garoppolo. After a Browns field goal, the 49ers continued their dominance, scoring an additional 17 points en route to a 31–3 blowout win. The 49ers defense held Baker Mayfield to just 100 passing yards and no touchdowns, marking Mayfield's first career start in which he did not throw a touchdown pass, having done so in each of his first 17 starts. The Browns also turned the ball over four times, including two Mayfield interceptions.

With the loss, the Browns fell to 2–3.

Week 6: vs. Seattle Seahawks

The Browns returned home to take on the Seattle Seahawks in Week 6 and opened the scoring with a Nick Chubb touchdown run. Seattle responded with a touchdown run by Russell Wilson, giving the Browns a 7–6 lead after a missed extra point by Seattle. The Browns then extended their lead to 20–6, with Baker Mayfield running in from 10 yards before throwing a 31-yard touchdown pass to Ricky Seals-Jones. Before halftime, Seattle scored on a pair of Jason Myers field goals and a touchdown pass from Wilson to Jaron Brown to cut the Browns' lead to 20–18. In the second half, Seattle took the lead on another Wilson touchdown pass to Brown, but the Browns responded with a Chubb touchdown run and a two-point pass from Mayfield to Demetrius Harris to retake the lead, 28–25. The Seahawks retook the lead with 3:30 left in the game, going up 32–28 thanks to a Chris Carson touchdown run, before picking off Mayfield on the Browns' ensuing drive to allow them to run down the clock and claim the win.

With the loss, the Browns went into their bye week at 2–4.

Week 8: at New England Patriots

After their bye week, the Browns traveled to New England for a Week 8 contest against the defending Super Bowl champion New England Patriots, who entered this game 7–0. The Patriots raced to a 17–0 first quarter lead, aided by two Nick Chubb fumbles and a Baker Mayfield interception on three consecutive offensive snaps for the Browns. Chubb's first fumble was returned by Dont'a Hightower for a 26–yard touchdown, while the Patriots' second touchdown came on a Tom Brady pass to Julian Edelman. Browns got on the board in the second quarter with a Mayfield touchdown pass to Demetrius Harris, to make the score 17–7 at halftime. In the third quarter, the Browns closed New England's lead to 17–10 with an Austin Seibert 38-yard field goal, but the Patriots responded with another Brady touchdown pass to Edelman on their next drive to extend their lead to 24–10. The teams traded field goals in the fourth quarter for a 27–13 Patriots win.

With the loss, the Browns fell to 2–5.

Week 9: at Denver Broncos

The Browns visited the Denver Broncos for a Week 9 match-up. The Browns hoped to end a three-game losing streak while Denver quarterback Brandon Allen was making his first career start in place of an injured Joe Flacco. Denver opened the scoring with an Allen 21–yard touchdown pass to Courtland Sutton. He added a 75–yard touchdown pass to Noah Fant in the second quarter. For the Browns, Austin Seibert kicked four field goals in the second quarter (three of which occurred with the Browns inside Denver's 15-yard line) and Denver's Brandon McManus added a field goal to give the Broncos a 17–12 halftime lead. In the second half, the Broncos extended their lead to 24–12 on a Phillip Lindsay touchdown run, while the Browns closed the Broncos' lead back to five points on a Baker Mayfield touchdown pass to Jarvis Landry. However, the Browns could not score again, resulting in a 24–19 Broncos' win.

With the loss, the Browns fell to 2–6. This marks the 12th straight season in which the Browns suffered a losing streak of at least four games. Following the game, safety Jermaine Whitehead, out of frustration, made inappropriate and threatening tweets in response to critics. He was subsequently released by the Browns.

Week 10: vs. Buffalo Bills

The Browns returned home to take on the Buffalo Bills, hoping to end their 4-game losing streak. The Browns scored a touchdown on the game's first drive on a Baker Mayfield 17-yard touchdown pass to Jarvis Landry. However, an unsportsmanlike conduct penalty on Landry resulted in the PAT attempt being kicked from 15 yards further back, and it was subsequently missed. Early in the second quarter, the Bills scored a touchdown on a Josh Allen 10-yard run to take a 7–6 lead. Browns kicker Austin Seibert nailed a 23-yard field goal, while Bills' kicker Stephen Hauschka missed a 35-yard field goal attempt late in the quarter, giving the Browns a 9–7 halftime lead. The Bills tied the game with a safety in the third quarter as Tremaine Edmunds sacked Mayfield in the end zone. Seibert added a field goal to give the Browns a 12–9 lead after three-quarters. In the fourth quarter, Allen gave the Bills a 16–12 lead on a 1-yard touchdown run. However, the Browns responded with an 82-yard drive culminating with a Mayfield touchdown pass to Rashard Higgins, giving the Browns a 19–16 lead with just under two minutes remaining. The Bills drove down the field, but Hauschka missed a 53-yard potential game-tying field goal with 22 seconds remaining, giving the Browns a 19–16 win.

With the win, the Browns improved to 3–6.

Week 11: vs. Pittsburgh Steelers

The Browns stayed home to face the Pittsburgh Steelers on Thursday Night Football. Browns quarterback Baker Mayfield scored the first points on a 1-yard touchdown run in the first quarter, set up by a 43-yard pass from Mayfield to wide receiver Odell Beckham Jr. The next score came in the second quarter, with a 1-yard touchdown catch by Jarvis Landry. The Steelers struck back in the third quarter with a touchdown completion by Steelers running back Jaylen Samuels, but Cleveland held off the Steelers for the win. Browns rookie tight end Stephen Carlson caught a touchdown pass in the fourth quarter for his first career touchdown. The Browns defense forced four interceptions of Steelers quarterback Mason Rudolph in the game.

A skirmish broke out between the two teams in the closing seconds of the game. After passing to Trey Edmunds, Rudolph found himself dragged down by Browns defensive end Myles Garrett. Upset by the late tackle, Rudolph started to attack Garrett by kicking him in the groin and attempting to pull off Garrett's helmet. Garrett then pulled off Rudolph's helmet and used it to hit Rudolph in the head. Steelers center Maurkice Pouncey and Browns defensive tackle Larry Ogunjobi then joined in on the fight in defense of their respective teammates. Garrett, Ogunjobi, and Pouncey were ejected from the game. Following the game, Garrett was suspended for the remainder of 2019 and required to apply for reinstatement in 2020, while Pouncey and Ogunjobi received suspensions of two games and one game, respectively. Garrett's suspension is the longest in NFL history for a single on-field transgression.

Landry recorded his 529th reception, breaking DeAndre Hopkins' record of most catches in an NFL player's first six seasons.

With the win, the Browns improved to 4–6. The win ended an 8-game winless streak to the Steelers that dated back to 2014. This also marked the first time in franchise history that the Browns defeated division rivals Baltimore and Pittsburgh in the same season.

Week 12: vs. Miami Dolphins

The Browns hosted the Miami Dolphins in their third straight home game. The Browns dominated the first half, building a 28–0 lead in the process. The Browns scored four first half touchdowns on three Baker Mayfield touchdown passes (two short passes to Jarvis Landry and a 35-yard pass to Odell Beckham Jr.) and a 6-yard run by Kareem Hunt. The Dolphins got on the board with a Jason Sanders field goal to make the score 28–3 at halftime. The Dolphins came back in the third quarter. Aided by a Mayfield interception and a missed field goal by Austin Seibert, the Dolphins scored two touchdowns on a Ryan Fitzpatrick 11-yard pass to Mike Gesicki and a Fitzpatrick 8-yard run, to close the Browns' lead to 28–17. However, the Browns responded in the fourth quarter with a pair of Seibert field goals and a Nick Chubb 5-yard touchdown run to go up 41–17. A late Miami touchdown made the final score 41–24.

With the win, the Browns improved to 5–6. This marked the Browns' 100th win since returning to the NFL in 1999. Linebacker Joe Schobert was named the AFC Defensive Player of the week after recording five tackles, four blocked passes, and two interceptions.

Week 13: at Pittsburgh Steelers

The Browns traveled to Pittsburgh for round two of their division rivalry with the Steelers. In the first quarter, the Browns scored first on an Austin Seibert 31-yard field goal. They extended their lead to 10–0 in the second quarter on a Baker Mayfield 15-yard touchdown pass to Kareem Hunt. The Steelers, however tied the game 10–10 before halftime with a Chris Boswell 39-yard field goal followed by a Devlin Hodges 30-yard touchdown pass to James Washington. In the third quarter, the Steelers took a 17–10 lead when Benny Snell ran for a 1-yard touchdown and added a Boswell 29-yard field goal to make it 20–10. Seibert got the Browns within a touchdown at 20–13 on a 34-yard field goal to make it 20–13. Getting the ball back later on in the quarter, the Browns had an opportunity to score a game-tying touchdown, However, Steelers cornerback and former Brown Joe Haden came up with the game-sealing interception of Mayfield.

With the loss, the Browns fell to 5–7. This marked the Browns' 16th consecutive loss in Pittsburgh. On the same day, the Baltimore Ravens won their game, thus mathematically eliminating the Browns from AFC North title contention. This is the Browns 27th consecutive season without a division title, the longest active streak in the NFL.

Week 14: vs. Cincinnati Bengals

The Browns returned home to battle their in-state rival Cincinnati Bengals. Cincinnati took an early 3–0 lead on a Randy Bullock 34-yard field goal. The Browns got on the board later in the first quarter as Denzel Ward intercepted an Andy Dalton pass and returned it 61 yards for a touchdown to take a 7–3 lead. Bullock added a 44-yard field goal to bring the Bengals to within 7–6 after the first quarter. Both teams scored a touchdown in the second quarter: the Bengals' coming on a Joe Mixon 1-yard run and the Browns' on a Baker Mayfield 7-yard run to give the Browns a 14–13 halftime lead. On the Browns' opening drive of the third quarter, they scored a touchdown on a Kareem Hunt 3-yard run to extend their lead to 21–13. The teams traded field goals to finish off the third quarter and also did so in the fourth quarter, to give the Browns a 27–19 win.

With the win, the Browns improved to 6–7.

Week 15: at Arizona Cardinals

The Browns traveled to Arizona for a Week 15 tilt with the Arizona Cardinals. The Cardinals scored the only first quarter points on a Kenyan Drake 5-yard touchdown run, to take a 7–0 lead. The Cardinals extended their lead to 14–0 in the second quarter with a Drake 1-yard touchdown run. The Browns responded with a Nick Chubb 33-yard touchdown run and an Austin Seibert 44-yard field goal to close the Cardinals' lead to 14–10. However, the Cardinals extended their lead to 21–10 late in the first half on a Kyler Murray 6-yard touchdown pass to Dan Arnold. In the third quarter, the Browns scored a touchdown on a Baker Mayfield 2-yard touchdown pass to Ricky Seals-Jones, but the Cardinals responded with a Drake 1-yard run to take a 28–17 lead into the fourth quarter. Early in the fourth quarter, Seibert missed a 45–yard field goal attempt wide left that would have moved the Browns to within one possession at 28–20. Instead, the Cardinals scored a touchdown on their ensuing drive on a Drake 17-yard run, his fourth touchdown on the day. After a Seals-Jones fumble, former Brown Zane Gonzalez kicked a 21-yard field goal to give the Cardinals a 38–17 lead. The Browns added a late touchdown on a Mayfield pass to Seals-Jones to make the final score 38–24.

With the loss, the Browns fell to 6–8.

Week 16: vs. Baltimore Ravens

With the loss, the Browns fell to 6–9. The loss eliminated the Browns from postseason contention for the 17th consecutive season, having last made the playoffs in 2002. The Browns were one of only two NFL teams, the other being the Tampa Bay Buccaneers, to not make the playoffs during the 2010s. The loss also meant the Browns would not improve upon their 7–8–1 record from their previous season, and it ensured the team's 12th consecutive season with a losing record, having last posted a non-losing record in 2007. The Browns finished 4–4 at home.

Week 17: at Cincinnati Bengals

With the loss, the Browns finished the season 6–10. They finished 2–6 in away games.

Following the game, the Browns fired head coach Freddie Kitchens after one season. On December 31, the Browns and general manager John Dorsey mutually agreed to part ways. Dorsey had served as the Browns' GM since December 2017.

Standings

Division

Conference

Team leaders

Individual honors 
On December 17, RB Nick Chubb and WR Jarvis Landry were named to the AFC Roster for the 2020 Pro Bowl. This marked Chubb's first Pro Bowl selection and Landry's fifth consecutive and fifth overall selection. Chubb was the AFC's starting running back. On January 9, 2020, G Joel Bitonio was also named to the Pro Bowl as an injury replacement, marking his second consecutive and second overall selection.

In addition, LB Joe Schobert was named a second alternate, CB Denzel Ward a fourth alternate, and WR Odell Beckham Jr. a fifth alternate at their respective positions.

On January 3, Bitonio was named to the AP All-Pro second team, his second consecutive and second overall All-Pro selection.

References

External links 
 2019 Cleveland Browns at Pro Football Reference (Profootballreference.com)
 2019 Cleveland Browns Statistics at jt-sw.com
 2019 Cleveland Browns Schedule at jt-sw.com
 2019 Cleveland Browns at DatabaseFootball.com  
 

 "Building the Browns 2019," (video) Cleveland Browns, April - Dec., 2019. 1: Meet Freddy Kitchens | 2: The Combine | 3: Odell Beckham Jr. Arrives | 4: The NFL Draft | 5: Rookie Minicamp| 6: Demarious Randall Graduates | 7: Organized Team Activities | 8. Mandatory Minicamp | 9: Training Camp Begins | 10: Colts Joint Practices | 11: Dawg Days of Camp | 12: The Preseason Comes to an End | 13: The Start of the Regular Season | 14. Overcoming Adversity | 15: One Game at a Time | 16: Next Man Up |

Cleveland
Cleveland Browns seasons
Cleveland Browns